RefugePoint is a non-profit organization founded in 2005. RefugePoint has referred over 54,000 refugees for resettlement.

Through direct services, RefugePoint provides services to meet the needs of individuals and households. Through field building, RefugePoint supports other organizations to accelerate and expand programs for reaching refugee populations.

RefugePoint works to identify and protect refugees who have fallen through the cracks of humanitarian assistance, with an emphasis on serving women, children, and urban refugees. RefugePoint has three offices, based in Cambridge, Massachusetts, United States; Nairobi, Kenya; and Geneva, Switzerland.

The organization has worked primarily in Africa, in 28 countries, and over 48 locations, including: Angola, Botswana, Burkina Faso, Burundi, Cameroon, Djibouti, Chad, Côte d'Ivoire, DRC, Egypt, Ethiopia, Guinea, Iraq, Kenya, Liberia, Malawi, Malaysia, Mozambique, Namibia, Niger, Rwanda, Senegal, South Africa, Sudan, Tanzania, Togo, Uganda, Zambia, and Zimbabwe.

RefugePoint is a member of Refugee Council USA (RCUSA), a coalition of U.S. non-governmental organizations focused on refugee protection.

History 
RefugePoint was founded in 2005 by Sasha Chanoff and Dr. John Wagacha Burton. While conducting refugee rescue operations with the International Organization for Migration (IOM), Chanoff became aware of the unseen and therefore unmet needs of the many refugees living in urban settings.

On June 29, 2011, Mapendo announced that it changed its name to RefugePoint.

Programs 

Resettlement

Resettlement involves permanently relocating refugees to a safe country. RefugePoint deploys Resettlement and Child Protection Experts across Africa to meet with refugees in remote and often dangerous locations. RefugePoint staff works to expand opportunities for resettlement to locations and populations that are chronically overlooked and underserved. RefugePoint also works to catalyze partnerships between the UNHCR, NGOs and governments to strengthen resettlement systems and policies. Since 2005, the RefugePoint team has helped over 54,000 refugees to access resettlement.

Self-reliance

Self-reliance involves stabilizing refugees in the countries to which they have fled and helping them regain the social and economic ability to meet their essential needs and transition off of assistance.

Urban Refugee Protection Program

RefugePoint works to achieve long-term stabilization of refugees through its Urban Refugee Protection Program (URPP) in Nairobi, Kenya. The program provides food and housing assistance, small business grants, access to health care, education, and counseling services. The URPP uses a case management approach to enhance coordination and match available services with the needs of each refugee household. The URPP helps refugee children to access education, and provides health and psychological services to many who have experienced trauma.

Awards

2013: The Center for Public Leadership at Harvard Kennedy School named RefugePoint founder and executive director Sasha Chanoff the 2013 recipient of the Gleitsman International Activist Award. The award is given biennially to a leader who has "improved the quality of life abroad and inspired others to do the same."

2010: RefugePoint's efforts were awarded with the Charles Bronfman Prize.

2007: RefugePoint received a Draper Richards Fellowship in 2007.

2006: RefugePoint won an Echoing Green Fellowship and was named a Waldzell Institute "Architect of the Future".

References 

International organizations based in the United States
Refugee aid organizations in the United States
Organizations established in 2005
2005 establishments in Massachusetts
Charities based in Massachusetts